There are two species of gecko named Blanford's rock gecko:

 Bunopus blanfordii
 Pristurus insignis